Cannibal is a 2006 German direct-to-video horror film written, directed and produced by Marian Dora in his feature film debut. The film centers on a mentally disturbed individual simply known as "The Man", who has cannibalistic fantasies. He makes a deal with a suicidal man known as "The Flesh" who agrees to let The Man eat him.

Plot 

In the intro, a mother reads the story of Hansel and Gretel to her young boy. The setting then moves to the present day, where The Man goes about his day-to-day routines and occasionally chats with others on his computer, where he looks for someone who shares his cannibalistic fantasies. The Man meets with several people he had chatted with, but he either rejects them or is rejected (and in one case attacked) by them, except for The Flesh, a suicidal man who volunteers to be killed and eaten by The Man. The Flesh travels to The Man from Berlin, and the two bond, having sex and frolicking in the nude both inside and around The Man's home.

When The Flesh decides that its time for him to die and be devoured, he tries to coerce The Man into biting off his penis, but The Man is unable to go through with it, even when The Flesh uses drugs to knock himself out in an attempt to make things easier. Disappointed, The Flesh chastises The Man. The Flesh decides to give him another chance when The Man begs him to stay just as he is about to board a train back to Berlin. Returning to The Man's home, The Flesh ingests a large amount of alcohol and pills, then instructs The Man to castrate him with a kitchen knife, which The Man succeeds at doing. The two then fry and attempt to eat the severed penis, before The Flesh seemingly dies of blood loss in a bath The Man places The Flesh in.

The Man drags The Flesh's inert body (which vomits and defecates repeatedly) to a room he has readied for slaughter. Before he can begin taking The Flesh apart, The Man is shocked to discover The Flesh is still alive, so he stabs him in the throat. The Man then beheads, guts and dismembers The Flesh, buries the inedible parts, and cooks and eats the rest; he places The Flesh's severed head at the head of the table. The Man then masturbates to snuff film-video footage of what he has done, and leaves.

Cast 

 Carsten Frank as The Man
 Victor Brandl as The Flesh
 Manoush as The Man's Mother
 L. Dora
 Carina Palmer
 Tobias Sickert
 Joachim Sigl
 Bernd Widmann

Production 

Cannibal is based on the true story of Armin Meiwes, who killed and ate a man whom he met on the Internet.

In 2004 director Marian Dora accepted Ulli Lommel's assignment to make a feature film in Germany that documented the Meiwes case. Dora's finished film was rejected by Lommel for being too gory, and Dora subsequently released the movie on his own in Germany months later. Lommel set about producing his own version of the Meiwes case, which became the 2007 film Diary of a Cannibal.

Release

Home media
Cannibal was released on DVD in Germany in April 2006., and in the United States by Anthem Pictures on December 19, 2006. The film also was released by Unearthed Films on a now out-of-print DVD.

Censorship
Cannibal was banned after its release in Germany on Meiwes’ request.

Reception 

Scott Weinberg of DVD Talk rated the film 2/5 stars and wrote, "One of the sickest and freakiest movies ever to come from a nation well-known for its freaky and sick movies (Germany), Cannibal is shocking, outrageous, sickening ... and just a little bit interesting because it's based on actual events."  Joshua Siebalt of Dread Central rated it 2/5 stars and wrote, "The only real selling point Cannibal has is its graphic depiction of cannibalism. There are some nasty, nasty moments throughout, but you have to get through a whole lot of nothing before you see them." Sean Leonard from HorrorNews.net praised the film, writing, "This is the first movie in a long time that disturbed me to my core. The entire second half of this movie is non-stop suffering, sadness, dismemberment, and cannibalism. It feels very real, like the viewer is watching from the next room, but also like the viewer is watching something real. The scary thing is, somewhere out there exists video of the actual events."

References

External links 
 
 
 

2006 films
2006 horror films
German splatter films
Horror films based on actual events
German drama films
Films about suicide
German horror films
German romance films
Films set in Germany
Films shot in Germany
2000s German-language films
Romantic horror films
2000s English-language films
Films about snuff films
German LGBT-related films
LGBT-related horror films
Direct-to-video horror films
LGBT-related films based on actual events
Films directed by Marian Dora
LGBT-related controversies in film
Obscenity controversies in film
Films about cannibalism
2006 directorial debut films
2006 LGBT-related films
2000s German films
2006 multilingual films
German multilingual films
English-language German films